The Suining Formation is a geological formation in China whose strata date back to the Early Cretaceous. Dinosaur remains are among the fossils that have been recovered from the formation. A 2019 paper shows zircon dating of the Suining Formation with a much younger age for the classically thought of Late Jurassic formation; the average age of the dating being roughly 114 myo or late upper Aptian. However, these results were subsequently challenged, with suggestions that the age of the zircons was affected by metamorphism, and that the zircons clustering around 145 Ma near the Jurassic Cretaceous boundary are closer to the correct date.

Paleobiota

Dinosaurs

See also 
 Qijianglong
 List of dinosaur-bearing rock formations

References

Bibliography 
  

Geologic formations of China
Lower Cretaceous Series of Asia
Cretaceous China
Aptian Stage
Paleontology in China
Landforms of Sichuan